David Benjamin Hooten (born December 31, 1962) is a restaurateur and politician who served as the County Clerk for Oklahoma County, Oklahoma from 2016 to 2022.

Early life
David Benjimen Hooten was born in Frascati, Italy, to Capt. Leon E. Hooten, Jr. (USAF) and his wife Lucia (née Di Beniditto). David was the youngest of seven children.
He attended school in Duncan, Oklahoma and Norman, Oklahoma. His family traveled across Europe during his father's military career. Hooten discusses in interviews how he loved music from a young age and he bought his first trumpet from a local antique store.

Hooten studied music in college and worked part time as a Calvin Klein model. He received a bachelor's degree in music education at North Texas State University, where he was principal trumpet in the University Symphony Orchestra. He later received a Master's in Trumpet performance from the University of Oklahoma in 1989.

Early musical career

Hooten's first album, The Trumpet Shall Sound, was released in 1989 and featured a popular rendition of Amazing Grace. 
He later performed Amazing Grace at the Memorial Ceremony for the victims of the Oklahoma City bombing.
In September 1999, Hooten performed for John Paul II at the Vatican.
Hooten also performed for the Thai Royal Family, Ronald Reagan, and George W. Bush.

Mama Lucia's
Hooten's mother owned a restaurant in Duncan, Oklahoma she started in 1972 called Mama Lucia's. In 1995 Hooten bought the restaurant from his mother and ran it until its closure in 2003.Despite closing the restaurant, Hooten continues to sell sauce made with his mother's recipe under the name "Hooten's Jazz Kitchen Meat Sauce".

Political career
Hooten supported Terry Neese before deciding to run for office himself. In January 2016 Hooten announced on social media that he endorsed Donald Trump for president.

2004 election
In 2004 Hooten filed as a Democrat to run for Oklahoma House of Representatives in District 87.  His opponent, fellow Democrat John Morgan, challenged his candidacy by claiming that Hooten was not properly registered with the State Election Board. Hooten's attorney produced a voter registration card from August, 2002, but Hooten stated he could not recall when he last voted. State Election Board chairman Glo Henley stated that she believed Hooten's name was purged from the voter roll for failing to vote for at least two years.  The board voted 2-1 to remove him from the ballot.

2014 election
In 2014 Hooten ran for State Senate in District 40, this time as a Republican.  His campaign was harmed when reports of a 2001 conviction for DUI and leaving the scene of an accident surfaced. Hooten finished fourth out of six candidates with 11.3% of the vote.

2016 election
In 2016 Hooten was one of three Republicans to challenge five term incumbent Carolynn Caudill in the Republican primary for Oklahoma County Clerk. He advanced to a runoff with Caudill. He later won the Republican primary.

Hooten won the GOP nomination with 65% of the vote and amassed 63.5% in the general election against Libertarian candidate Chris Powell.

County Clerk
Within a month of taking office, Hooten terminated five employees who would go on to file wrongful termination claims, charging that they were fired because they had been volunteers for the campaign of the incumbent, Carolyn Caudill, whom Hooten defeated in a primary runoff for the GOP nomination. In November 2018 the County Commissioners voted to pay $175,000 to Leona Porter, a county employee since 1988 and the former wife of civil rights leader E. Melvin Porter to settle her claims of discrimination by Hooten.  According to the lawsuit Hooten reduced Porter's work responsibilities and pay, eventually requiring her to sit in a rocking chair at the entrance to the County Clerk's Office as a greeter before finally deciding to fire her.  The settlement will be funded by an increase in property taxes.

A federal jury has rejected claims that Oklahoma County Clerk David Hooten fired employees for political reasons. U.S. District Judge Charles B. Goodwin threw out the claims of five of those former employees before trial. The jury rejected the claims of the remaining plaintiffs, Phillip Malone and Donella Epps. "While I've come to understand why more business leaders choose not to undertake public service, I'm glad I did run for office and remain grateful for the continued support of Oklahoma County voters," Hooten said after the verdict.

Hooten was investigated by the Oklahoma County Sheriff's Department after an audio recording by one of his female employees in the County Clerk's Office was reported. In it, Hooten details a team-building trip that would require employees to face their fears, participate in physical activities that would make them sore, and engage in mandatory alcohol use. He claims that his brain has been chemically altered to prevent him from ever getting drunk. He announced he would resign on June 17, 2022 after Oklahoma County District Attorney David Prater recommended he be suspended and removed "on the grounds of oppression in office, corruption in office and willful maladministration."

2022 election
Hooten ran for the Republican nomination for Oklahoma State Treasurer in the 2022 Oklahoma State Treasurer election. He placed third in the June 28th primary and did not advance to the August runoff.

References

1962 births
American politicians who switched parties
Candidates in the 2022 United States elections
County clerks in Oklahoma
Living people
University of North Texas alumni
University of Oklahoma alumni